Bryan Greenberg (born May 24, 1978) is an American actor and singer, known for his starring role as Ben Epstein in the HBO original series How to Make It in America as well as a recurring role as Jake Jagielski in the WB series One Tree Hill and as Nick Garrett on the short-lived ABC drama October Road. His film work includes The Perfect Score, Prime, Bride Wars, and Friends with Benefits.

Early life 
Greenberg was born in Omaha, Nebraska, U.S. the son of psychologists Denise "Denny" (born 1951) and Carl Greenberg (born 1950). Greenberg was born to Jewish parents; he was raised in Conservative Judaism and attended Beth El Synagogue in Omaha. Greenberg had a Bar Mitzvah ceremony, belonged to Jewish youth groups, went to Jewish summer camps, and traveled to Israel.

At seven years old, when Greenberg's younger sister Becca was in dance class, he got the opportunity to appear in the lead role in the Omaha Ballet production of The Nutcracker. He toured with the show for two months and joined a children's theater company in Omaha. At age 12, Greenberg and his family moved to St. Louis, Missouri. Shortly thereafter, he got his first national role as the kid in the Cookie Crisp cereal commercial. As time went on, he was offered more acting opportunities.

He graduated from Parkway Central High School in Chesterfield, Missouri in 1996. Greenberg moved to New York City after high school. He attended and worked at a Jewish summer camp located in Webster, Wisconsin, called Herzl Camp. He starred as Joseph in a camp-wide production of Joseph and the Amazing Technicolor Dreamcoat in 1992.

Greenberg received his Bachelor of Fine Arts in Theatre at New York University in 2000.

Acting career 
While at NYU, Greenberg auditioned and worked as a waiter, bartender, caterer and assistant to a mortgage broker. He was cast as Romeo in NYU's performance of Romeo and Juliet and performed with the Experimental Theater Workshop, the Atlantic Theater Company and the Amsterdam Experimental Workshop.

In 1997, he got a small role on the television series Law & Order. Soon after this appearance, Greenberg got an agent and one year later made his big screen debut in A Civil Action.

After landing small roles on several TV series (Boston Public, The Sopranos, and Third Watch among others), Greenberg was cast as Matty Matthews, a high school student trying to pass the S.A.T. exam, in the film The Perfect Score. After graduating from NYU, Bryan moved to California. While he was still appearing in One Tree Hill, he began shooting another television show produced by George Clooney for HBO called Unscripted.

Greenberg's first starring role was in the Ben Younger film Prime (2005). He played David Bloomberg, a young artist who falls in love with one of his mother Meryl Streep's therapy patients, played by Uma Thurman. Greenberg then starred in October Road on ABC and appeared with Alan Rickman in the film Nobel Son in 2008. In 2009, Greenberg appeared in the film Bride Wars with Kate Hudson and Anne Hathaway and starred opposite Alexis Bledel and Scott Porter in the indie film The Good Guy, which was released in February 2010.

His series How to Make It in America premiered on HBO on February 14, 2010. The Washington Post called it "The New Yorkiest thing you could find on television, which is saying something," and praised its "portrayal of a dirty, scrappy, multi-ethnic New York culture." The New York Times said the "series has great music (the theme song is Aloe Blacc’s 'I Need a Dollar') and there are some snarky asides about hipster New York." Season 2 premiered on October 2, 2011. On December 20, 2011, HBO announced the cancellation of the show.

In 2012, Greenberg co-starred with Laura Prepon in the independent comedy film The Kitchen. That same year, Greenberg starred in the dark comedy film The Normals, which follows a young man who enters a two-week clinical trial of an anti-psychotic treatment at a drug-testing center in Queens.

In 2013, Greenberg began shooting the untitled Lance Armstrong biopic alongside Ben Foster, who will play Armstrong.

In 2015, Greenberg and his wife Jamie Chung co-starred together in the romantic drama Already Tomorrow in Hong Kong.

Music 
In 2007, Greenberg released his debut album, Waiting for Now. He has toured with Gavin DeGraw, Michael Tolcher, Ari Hest, and Graham Colton. At his New York City Show at the High Line Ballroom, Greenberg was joined by How to Make it in America co-star Kid Cudi. Greenberg's songs have been featured in many of his film and television work, including One Tree Hill, October Road, and Nobel Son.

In 2011, Greenberg released his second album, We Don't Have Forever, produced by Thom Monahan (Vetiver, Devendra Banhart, Gary Louris), which included the single "Walk Away". The album also included "You Can Run", a collaboration with How to Make It in America co-star and rapper Kid Cudi. Greenberg said he wrote the record over a period of two years when he was going through a lot of changes (friends, personal life, career) and decided to title the record We Don't Have Forever to reflect that.

Personal life 
Greenberg began dating actress Jamie Chung in early 2012. They became engaged in December 2013. During a visit to Chung's hometown of San Francisco, Greenberg proposed to Chung by singing a song he wrote. They were married in October 2015 at the El Capitan Canyon resort in Santa Barbara, California. The wedding was a three-day celebration consisting of a welcome dinner on Halloween Eve to which guests were required to wear costumes, followed by a wedding ceremony on October 31 in which Chung and Greenberg exchanged non-denominational vows.  On October 24, 2021, it was announced that the two are parents of twin boys.

Filmography

Film

Television

Discography

Albums 

 Waiting for Now (2007)
 We Don't Have Forever (2011)
 Everything Changes (2015)
 The 36 Hour - EP (2019)

Other activities 
 In 2008, Greenberg appeared in will.i.am's song "Yes We Can."
 In 2010, Greenberg made a public service announcement about the Gulf Oil Spill for Natural Resources Defense Council calling for Clean Energy Legislation. It was released July 20, 2010.

References

External links 
 
 
 

1978 births
20th-century American male actors
21st-century American male actors
21st-century American singers
American male film actors
American male singer-songwriters
American male television actors
Jewish American male actors
Living people
Male actors from Omaha, Nebraska
Male actors from St. Louis
Musicians from Omaha, Nebraska
Musicians from St. Louis
Tisch School of the Arts alumni
Parkway Central High School alumni
Singer-songwriters from Missouri
Singer-songwriters from Nebraska